A Song of Sixpence is a 1964 novel by A. J. Cronin about the coming to manhood of Laurence Carroll and his life in Scotland. Its sequel is A Pocketful of Rye.

As with several of his other novels, Cronin drew on his own experiences growing up in Scotland for this book. The titles of both novels come from the children's nursery rhyme, "Sing a Song of Sixpence".

British bildungsromans
Novels by A. J. Cronin
Novels set in Scotland
1969 British novels
Victor Gollancz Ltd books
Little, Brown and Company books